Bryan Rodney (born April 22, 1984) is a Canadian former professional ice hockey defenceman who played in the National Hockey League (NHL) for the Carolina Hurricanes and the Edmonton Oilers. He won the Memorial Cup in 2005 with the London Knights.

Playing career
Rodney signed a one-year contract with the Anaheim Ducks on July 5, 2011. He was traded to the Edmonton Oilers for Ryan O'Marra on February 16, 2012. Without a contract due to the 2012 NHL lockout, Rodney eventually signed as a free agent midway through the 2012–13 season, to an AHL deal with the Manchester Monarchs for the remainder of the campaign on December 3, 2012.

On July 29, 2013, Rodney secured a NHL contract as a free agent, signing a one-year, two-way deal with the Nashville Predators. He was assigned to AHL affiliate, the Milwaukee Admirals for the duration of the 2013–14 season.

On October 8, 2014 he signed as a free agent a one-year contract with HC Bolzano, the Italian-based team, who plays in the Austrian Hockey League.

He signed a one-year contract with Czech hockey team HC Energie.

Career statistics

References

External links

1984 births
Living people
Albany River Rats players
Bolzano HC players
Carolina Hurricanes players
Charlotte Checkers (1993–2010) players
Charlotte Checkers (2010–) players
Columbia Inferno players
Edmonton Oilers players
Elmira Jackals (ECHL) players
Hartford Wolf Pack players
HC Karlovy Vary players
Sportspeople from London, Ontario
Kingston Frontenacs players
London Knights players
Manchester Monarchs (AHL) players
Milwaukee Admirals players
Oklahoma City Barons players
Ottawa 67's players
Syracuse Crunch players
Ice hockey people from Ontario
Undrafted National Hockey League players
Canadian ice hockey defencemen
Canadian expatriate ice hockey players in the Czech Republic
Canadian expatriate ice hockey players in Italy
Canadian expatriate ice hockey players in the United States